gal-dem (stylised lower case) is an independent British online and print magazine produced by women of colour and non-binary people of colour.

History and profile
The magazine was founded by Liv Little in 2015. It produces one printed issue a year, as well as appearing in its online format. The website has six content sections: arts, lifestyle, music, news, opinion, and politics. The first print issue, "the gal-hood issue", sold out its print run of 1,000 copies; the second issue, "the home issue", was planned to have a print run of 3,000 and also sold out.

In 2016, the gal-dem editorial collective curated an event at the Victoria and Albert Museum as part of its Friday Lates series. It showcased work by contemporary young artists of colour and was described in The Guardian as "nothing short of breathtaking".

In August 2018, the gal-dem team guest-edited an issue of  The Guardian'''s Weekend magazine.

In June 2019 gal-dem released the book "I Will Not Be Erased": Our Stories About Growing Up As People of Colour'', an anthology from some of the women and non-binary people of colour who write for the magazine.

References

External links

2015 establishments in the United Kingdom
Annual magazines published in the United Kingdom
Feminism in the United Kingdom
Feminist magazines
Independent magazines
Magazines established in 2015
Magazines published in London
Online magazines published in the United Kingdom
Women's magazines published in the United Kingdom